Samoan New Zealanders are Samoan immigrants in New Zealand, their descendants, and New Zealanders of Samoan ethnic descent. They constitute one of New Zealand's most sizeable ethnic minorities. In the 2018 census, 182,721 New Zealanders identified themselves as being of Samoan ethnicity with 55,512 stating that they were born in Samoa, and 861 stating that they were born in American Samoa.

History

Overview
The country of Samoa (distinct from American Samoa) has a unique historical relationship with New Zealand, having been administered by New Zealand from 1914 to 1962.

Notable levels of Samoan migration to New Zealand began in the 1950s. In the 1970s, Samoan illegal immigrants were the targets of notorious "dawn raids" by the police, which led to accusations of ethnic bias in tackling illicit immigration. That same decade, some Samoan New Zealanders joined the newborn Polynesian Panthers, an organisation dedicated to supporting Pacific Islander New Zealanders, for example by providing information on their legal rights. The number of Samoan-born residents in New Zealand doubled to over 24,000 during the 1970s. In Auckland, Samoan communities developed in inner city suburbs, such as Ponsonby, Freemans Bay and Grey Lynn. By the mid-1970s, gentrification caused Samoan communities to relocate to more distant suburbs, such as Māngere and Massey. Grey Lynn continued to have a large Samoan population until the mid-1980s.

In 1982, a number of Samoan-born residents were granted citizenship with the Citizenship (Western Samoa) Act. Samoan immigration in New Zealand has subsequently been regulated by quotas. Since 2002, 1,100 Samoans are granted entry each year.

In the 1980s, figures from the Samoan community became nationally recognised New Zealand celebrities, such as rugby union player Michael Jones, who grew up in Te Atatū South. In 1993, Samoan-born Taito Phillip Field became the first Pasifika member of parliament (MP), when he was won the Otara electorate seat for Labour.

Samoan New Zealanders, compared to other groups such as Dutch New Zealanders who immigrated to New Zealand at the same time, retain a large number of Samoan language speakers.

Demographics
The 1874 census recorded 6 Samoans in New Zealand. Numbers have increased steadily ever since, to 279 in 1936, 1,336 in 1951, 19,711 in 1976, 24,141 in 1981, and 47,118 in 2001.

There were 182,721 people identifying as being part of the Samoan ethnic group at the 2018 New Zealand census, making up 3.9% of New Zealand's population. This is an increase of 38,583 people (26.8%) since the 2013 census, and an increase of 51,618 people (39.4%) since the 2006 census. Some of the increase between the 2013 and 2018 census was due to Statistics New Zealand adding ethnicity data from other sources (previous censuses, administrative data, and imputation) to the 2018 census data to reduce the number of non-responses.

There were 91,443 males and 91,275 females, giving a sex ratio of 1.002 males per female. The median age was 22.8 years, compared to 37.4 years for New Zealand as a whole; 62,688 people (34.3%) were aged under 15 years, 50,229 (27.5%) were 15 to 29, 59,859 (32.8%) were 30 to 64, and 9,942 (5.4%) were 65 or older.

In terms of population distribution, 64.9% of Samoan New Zealanders live in the Auckland region, 27.0% live in the North Island outside the Auckland region, and 8.1% live in the South Island. The Māngere-Ōtāhuhu local board area of Auckland has the highest concentration of Samoan people at 26.8%, followed by the Ōtara-Papatoetoe local board area (24.2%) and the Manurewa local board area (19.7%). Porirua City has the highest concentration of Samoan peoples outside of Auckland at 16.1%. The Kaikōura District had the lowest concentration of Samoan people at 0.2%, followed by the Gore, Queenstown-Lakes, Southland and Waimate districts, all at 0.3%.

A majority of New Zealanders of Samoan ethnicity today are New Zealand-born. At the 2013 census, 62.7 percent of Samoan New Zealanders were born in New Zealand. Of the overseas-born population, 84 percent had been living in New Zealand for at least five years, and 48 percent had been living in New Zealand for at least 20 years.

At the 2013 census, 63.8 percent of Samoan New Zealanders were in the labour force, of which 15.3 percent were unemployed. The large employment industries of Samoans were manufacturing (17.3 percent), health care and social assistance (9.1 percent), and retail trade (8.7 percent).

Culture
In 2013, 56% of ethnic Samoan New Zealanders were able to speak the Samoan language. As of 2018, Samoan is the third most-spoken language in New Zealand, behind English and Māori.

Samoan cultural values, the "Samoan way of life" (fa‘asamoa), are reportedly retained particularly by elderly members of the community, and include respect and mutual help within the extended family (‘aiga), as well as fa‘alavelave (ceremonial and family obligations), and attendance at a Christian church. In 2013, 83.4 percent of Samoans affiliated with at least one religion, compared with 55.0 percent for all New Zealanders.

Traditional tattooing (tatau) is embraced by some Samoan New Zealanders, both men and women, as an expression of cultural identity.

Samoans have contributed significantly to New Zealand culture in the fields of art, music, literature and sport.

Notable Samoan New Zealanders

Arts

Aaradhna – R&B artist (Samoan mother, Indian father)
Frankie Adams - actress
Adeaze – R&B Group Name of 2 Artists, Guitarists & Vocalists – Nainz Tupa'i & Viiz Tupa'i
Nick Afoa - singer
Alex Aiono – singer/producer (Samoan-New Zealand father)
KJ Apa – actor (of paternal Samoan descent)
Tusiata Avia - author
Teuila Blakely - actress
Jackie Clarke – actress, comedian
Joseph Churchward – graphic designer
David Dallas – rapper (half Samoan)
Iosefa Enari – opera singer
Eteuati Ete – comedian (Laughing Samoans)
Daniel Faitaua – news presenter (born in Christchurch)
Tulele Faletolu – worship leader/singer
David Fane - actor
Tofiga Fepulea'i – comedian (Laughing Samoans)
Fatu Feu'u – painter
Sia Figiel – novelist and poet
Mario Gaoa – actor, writer and director
Dei Hamo – rapper
Jamoa Jam – vocal quartet
Bob Jahnke - artist
Jay'ed – singer/songwriter
Kings – rapper/songwriter
King Kapisi – hip hop artist
Freddie Keil – musician
Oscar Kightley – actor, writer and television presenter
Yuki Kihara - artist 
John Kneubuhl – television writer
Beulah Koale - actor
Ladi 6 – singer/MC
Jay Laga'aia – actor
Jawsh 685 – record producer
Lily Laita – painter and ceramic sculptor
Nathaniel Lees – actor
Andy Leleisi'uao - artist
Jonathan Lemalu – Grammy winning opera singer
Stacey Leilua - actor 
Pua Magasiva – actor and radio presenter
Robbie Magasiva – actor
Rose Matafeo – comedian (Samoan father)
Karlo Mila - writer and poet
Naked Samoans – comedy group
Rene Naufahu – actor, screen writer and director
Chong Nee – hip hop and R&B writer, producer and singer
Louis Sutherland – director, actor, two-time winner at Cannes Film Festival
Savage – rapper
Scribe – rapper
Tusi Tamasese – film director
Michel Tuffery – painter and sculptor
Lani Tupu - actor
Jared Turner - actor (Samoan mother)
Sima Urale - film director and screen writer
Tha Feelstyle – hip hop artist, rapper
Rosita Vai – pop and R&B singer
the Yandall Sisters – singers
Albert Wendt – writer
Emily Williams – singer

Sports

Maselino Masoe – Boxer (middleweight, Former World Champion)
Joseph Parker – Boxer
David Tua – Boxer
Rodney Reid - Soccer player, New Zealand
Murphy Su'a – Cricketer, New Zealand
Ross Taylor – Cricketer, New Zealand
Beatrice Faumuina – Discus thrower (Former World Champion)
Mark Hunt – Kickboxer in K-1 / mixed martial artist in Pride FC & UFC
Ray Sefo – Kickboxer in K-1
Robert Whittaker – mixed martial artist
Cheree Crowley - Wrestler
Rita Fatialofa – Netball player (Silver Ferns)
Paula Griffin – Netball player (Silver Ferns)
April Ieremia – Netball player (Silver Ferns)
Cathrine Latu – Netball player (Silver Ferns)
Bernice Mene – Netball player (Silver Ferns)
Grace Rasmussen – Netball player (Silver Ferns)
Sheryl Scanlan nee Clarke – Netball player (Silver Ferns)
Frances Solia – Netball player
Lorna Suafoa – Netball player (Silver Ferns)
Maria Tutaia – Netball player (Silver Ferns)
Linda Vagana – Netball player (Silver Ferns)
Brad Abbey - Rugby League player
Jack Afamasaga – Rugby League player
Bunty Afoa - - Rugby league player
Fred Ah Kuoi – Rugby League player
Isaak Ah Mau – Rugby League player
Leeson Ah Mau – Rugby League player
Patrick Ah Van – Rugby League Player 
Josh Aloiai - Rugby league player
Daejarn Asi - Rugby League player
Nelson Asofa-Solomona – Rugby League player
Roy Asotasi – Rugby League player
Renouf Atoni - Rugby league player
Andrew Bentley - Rugby League player
Kane Bentley - Rugby League player
Monty Betham – former professional rugby league footballer & Boxer 
Dean Blore - Rugby League player
Shawn Blore - Rugby League player
Dylan Brown - Rugby League player
Fa'amanu Brown - Rugby League player
George Carmont – Rugby League player
Michael Chee-Kam -Rugby League player
Erin Clark – Rugby League player
Oscar Danielson – Rugby League player
Mark Elia – Rugby League player
Herman Ese'ese - Rugby League player
Henry Fa'afili – former professional rugby league footballer & Manu Samoa player
David Fa'alogo – Rugby League player
Poasa Faamausili - Rugby league player
Maurie Fa'asavalu – Rugby League player & Manu Samoa player
Sonny Fai – Rugby League player
David Faiumu – Rugby League player
Bureta Faraimo - Rugby league player
Sione Faumuina – Rugby League player
Max Feagai - Rugby League player
Olsen Filipaina – Rugby League player
Marvin Filipo – Rugby League player 
Joe Galuvao – Rugby League player
James Gavet – Rugby League player 
Pita Godinet – Rugby League player
Harrison Hansen – Rugby League player
Chanel Harris-Tavita - Rugby League player
Hymel Hunt - Rugby League player
Karmichael Hunt - Rugby League player
Krisnan Inu – Rugby League player
Masada Iosefa – Rugby League player
Willie Isa – Rugby League player
Jamayne Isaako - Rugby League player
Sam Kasiano – Rugby league player 
Oregon Kaufusi - Rugby league player
Tim Lafai – Rugby league player
Ali Lauitiiti – Rugby League player
Tasesa Lavea – Rugby League player & Manu Samoa player
Joseph Leilua – Rugby League player
Connelly Lemuelu - Rugby League player
Spencer Leniu - Rugby League player
Moses Leota – Rugby League player
Kylie Leuluai – Rugby League player
Phillip Leuluai – Rugby League player
Thomas Leuluai – Rugby League player
Danny Levi - Rugby League player
Jeff Lima – Rugby League player
Mason Lino – Rugby League player
Sam Lisone - Rugby League player
Isaac Liu - Rugby League player
Jamahl Lolesi – Rugby League player
Jarome Luai - Rugby League player
Patrick Mago - Rugby League player
Hutch Maiava – Rugby League player
Greg Marzhew - Rugby league player 
Mose Masoe – Rugby League player
Willie Mason - Rugby League player
Suaia Matagi – Rugby League player
Steve Matai – Rugby League player
Ben Matulino – Rugby League player
Ken Maumalo – Rugby league player
Wayne McDade – Rugby League player
Francis Meli – Rugby League player
Constantine Mika – Rugby League player
Thomas Mikaele - Rugby League player
Junior Moors – Rugby League player 
Ronaldo Mulitalo - Rugby League player
Zane Musgrove - Rugby League player
Jeremiah Nanai - Rugby league player
Frank-Paul Nu'uausala – Rugby League player
Hitro Okesene – Rugby League player
Keenan Palasia - Rugby League player
Iafeta Paleaaesina – Rugby League player
Sam Panapa – Rugby League player
Abraham Papalii - Rugby League player
Isaiah Papali'i - Rugby League player
Josh Papalii – Rugby League player
Junior Pauga - Rugby League player
Jaxson Paulo - Rugby League player 
Joseph Paulo – Rugby League player
Junior Paulo – Rugby League player
Franklin Pele - Rugby League player
Jordan Pereira - Rugby League player
Eddy Pettybourne – Rugby League player
Apollo Perelini – Former Rugby league player & Manu Samoa player
Sam Perrett – Rugby League player
Dominique Peyroux – Rugby League player 
Willie Poching – Rugby League player
Frank Pritchard – Rugby League player
Frank Puletua – Rugby League player
Tony Puletua – Rugby League player
Nathaniel Roache - Rugby League player
Ben Roberts – Rugby League player
Iva Ropati – Rugby League player
Jerome Ropati – Rugby League player
Tea Ropati – Rugby League player
Setaimata Sa – Rugby League player & Manu Samoa player
Smith Samau – Rugby League player
Junior Sau – Rugby League player
Andre Savelio - Rugby League player
Jesse Sene-Lefao - Rugby League player
Lagi Setu – Rugby League player
Ava Seumanufagai – Rugby league player
Jerry Seuseu – Rugby League player
Tim Simona – Rugby League player
Tukimihia Simpkins - Rugby League player
Toafofoa Sipley - Rugby League player
Jeremy Smith – Rugby League player
Iosia Soliola – Rugby League player
David Solomona – Rugby League player
Denny Solomona - Rugby League player 
Malo Solomona – Rugby League player
Tupou Sopoaga – Rugby League player 
Chase Stanley – Rugby League player
Kyle Stanley – Rugby League player
Jaydn Su'A - Rugby League player
Sauaso Sue - Rugby League player
Anthony Swann – Rugby League player
Logan Swann – Rugby League player
Sam Tagataese – Rugby League player
Willie Talau – Rugby League player
Tony Tatupu – Rugby League player
Mark Taufua – Rugby League player
Murray Taulagi - Rugby League player
Misi Taulapapa – Rugby League player
Martin Taupau - Rugby League player
Ben Te'o – Rugby League player
Jazz Tevaga – Rugby League player
Junior Tia-Kilifi – Rugby League player
Matthew Timoko - Rugby League player 
Motu Tony – Rugby League player
Tony Tuimavave – Rugby League player
Braden Uele – Rugby league player
Wayne Ulugia – Rugby League player
Matt Utai – Rugby League player
Joe Vagana – Rugby League player
Nigel Vagana – Rugby League player
Taioalo Vaivai - Rugby League player
Daniel Vidot – Rugby League player
Ruben Wiki – Rugby League player
Darrell Williams – Rugby League player
Antonio Winterstein – Rugby League player
Frank Winterstein – Rugby League player
Matthew Wright – Rugby League player
Cameron Howieson – Soccer player New Zealand Men's
Dane Ingham – Soccer player New Zealand Men's
Jai Ingham – Soccer player New Zealand Men's
Bill Tuiloma - Soccer player New Zealand Men's
Renee Leota – Soccer player New Zealand Women's
Emma Hunter – Swimmer (Olympics)

All Blacks (past & present)

 Asafo Aumua –  (All Black number 1163)
 John Afoa –  (All Black number 1062)
 Sosene Anesi –  (All Black number 1054)
 Ben Atiga –  (All Black number 1037)
 Graeme Bachop –  (All Black number 885)
 Stephen Bachop - (All Black number 925)
 Andrew Blowers –  (All Black number 956)
 Olo Brown – (All Black number 910)
 Frank Bunce – (All Black number 915)
 Caleb Clarke –  (All Black number 1187)
 Eroni Clarke –  (All Black number 919)
 Jerry Collins – (All Black number 1002), captain
 Christian Cullen –  (All Black number 952)
 Matt Duffie –  (All Black number 1164)
 Charlie Faumuina –  (All Black number 1116)
 Ross Filipo –  (All Black number 1070)
 Alex Hodgman –  (All Black number 1190)
 Carl Hoeft –  (All Black number 971)
 Alama Ieremia – (All Black number 942)
 Akira Ioane –  (All Black number 1166)
 Josh Ioane –  (All Black number 1185)
 Rieko Ioane –  (All Black number 1156)
 Michael Jones – (All Black number 882)
 Jerome Kaino –  (All Black number 1050)
 Josh Kronfeld –  (All Black number 943)
 Pat Lam – (All Black number 928)
 Casey Laulala –  (All Black number 1048)
 Nepo Laulala –  (All Black number 1139)
 Anton Lienert-Brown –  (All Black number 1153)
 Keith Lowen –  (All Black number 1020)
 Steven Luatua –  (All Black number 1121)
 Lelia Masaga –  (All Black number 1092)
 Chris Masoe –  (All Black number 1059)
 Aaron Mauger –  (All Black number 1013)
 Nathan Mauger –  (All Black number 1008)
 Keven Mealamu – (All Black number 1026), captain
 Liam Messam - (All Black number 1082)
 Brad Mika –  (All Black number 1024)
 Dylan Mika –  (All Black number 982)
 Richard Mo'unga –  (All Black number 1167)
 Mils Muliaina – (All Black number 1033), captain
 Ma'a Nonu –  (All Black number 1031)
 Dalton Papalii –  (All Black number 1176)
 Stephen Perofeta - (All Black number 1206)
 Augustine Pulu –  (All Black number 1136)
 Francis Saili –  (All Black number 1126)
 Ardie Savea –  (All Black number 1147), captain
 Julian Savea –  (All Black number 1111)
 John Schuster –  (All Black number 889)
 John Schwalger –  (All Black number 1071)
 Kevin Senio –  (All Black number 1058)
 Dave Solomon –  (All Black number 415)
 Frank Solomon –  (All Black number 387)
 Rodney So'oialo –  (All Black number 1028), captain
 Lima Sopoaga –  (All Black number 1145)
 Benson Stanley –  (All Black number 1102)
 Jeremy Stanley –  (All Black number 963)
 Joe Stanley –  (All Black number 874)
 Angus Ta'avao –  (All Black number 1175)
 Mark Telea –  (All Black number 1207)
 Neemia Tialata –  (All Black number 1060)
 Filo Tiatia –  (All Black number 993)
 Isaia Toeava –  (All Black number 1064)
 Ofisa Tonu'u – (All Black number 957)
 Jeffery Toomaga-Allen –  (All Black number 1130)
 Mose Tuiali'i –  (All Black number 1042)
 Va'aiga Tuigamala – (All Black number 900)
 Patrick Tuipulotu –  (All Black number 1133)
 Roger Tuivasa-Sheck –  (All Black number 1204)
 Richard Turner –  (All Black number 917)
 Tana Umaga – (All Black number 961), captain
 Peter Umaga-Jensen –  (All Black number 1189)
 Victor Vito –  (All Black number 1103)
 Bryan Williams –  (All Black number 689)
 Sonny Bill Williams – (All Black number 1108)
 Rudi Wulf –  (All Black number 1077)

General

Tulele Faletolu – worship leader/singer – Hillsong Church
Samani Pulepule – Preacher – Evangelist

Politics

Arthur Anae – politician
Barbara Edmonds - politician 
Taito Phillip Field – politician
Mark Gosche – politician
Luamanuvao Winnie Laban – politician
Agnes Loheni – politician
Peseta Sam Lotu-Iiga – politician
Carmel Sepuloni - politician 
William Sio – politician

See also

 New Zealand–Samoa relations
 Samoan Australians

References

 
Polynesian New Zealander